Never Here is an American thriller film directed and written by Camille Thoman. The film stars Mireille Enos. It premiered at the Los Angeles Film Festival on June 18, 2017 and will be distributed by Vertical Entertainment. It marked the final film role for actor Sam Shepard.

Cast 
 Mireille Enos as Miranda Fall
 Sam Shepard as Paul Stark
 Goran Višnjić as S 
 Vincent Piazza as Andy Williams
 Nina Arianda as Margeret Lockwood

Production 
On May 14, 2014, it was announced that Mireille Enos was cast in the leading role of the feature film debut for documentary director Camille Thoman. Sam Shepard and Goran Višnjić were later cast. Filming began on October 24, 2014, and ended on November 23, 2014 in New York. Executive producers on the film included actor Zachary Quinto and Neal Dodson.

References

External links 
 

2017 films
2017 thriller drama films
2017 drama films
American thriller drama films
2010s English-language films
2010s American films